The Steinbach City Council is the governing body of the City of Steinbach, Manitoba, Canada.

The council consists of the mayor and six councillors.

Council members
Earl Funk - Mayor
Bill Hiebert
Jake Hiebert
Damian Penner
Susan Penner
Jac Siemens
Michael Zwaagstra

Mayoral history
The unincorporated village of Steinbach was governed by a Schulz (mayor) and Schultebott (council) from 1874 to 1947 when Steinbach was incorporated as a town (and later as a city). Steinbach's first schulz was Johan Reimer, while the longest-serving schulz was Johan G. Barkman, who served as schulz for 25 years. His grandson Leonard Barkman also later served as mayor.
The following chart lists Steinbach's mayors since incorporation as a town in 1947.

See also
Manitoba municipal elections, 2006
Manitoba municipal elections, 2010

References

External links
Steinbach City Council

Municipal councils in Manitoba
Steinbach, Manitoba